The Abbottabad cricket team, also known as the Falcons, was a Pakistani first-class cricket team from Abbottabad. Their home ground was the Abbottabad Cricket Stadium in Pakistan. The team played in the Quaid-i-Azam Trophy competition, making their first-class debut in the 2005–06 season. The Abbottabad Falcons played in Twenty20 and List A domestic cricket tournaments.

See also
 List of Abbottabad cricketers

External links
 Abbottabad at CricketArchive
 Abbottabad at CricInfo

Pakistani first-class cricket teams
Abbottabad District